John Prior was an Irish Cumann na nGaedheal politician. He was first elected to Dáil Éireann as a Cumann na nGaedheal Teachta Dála (TD) for the Cork West constituency at the 1923 general election. He lost his seat at the June 1927 general election.

References

Year of birth missing
Year of death missing
Cumann na nGaedheal TDs
Members of the 4th Dáil
Politicians from County Cork